Founded in 2008, Voxofon provides mobile apps and communication services utilizing over-the-top (OTT) voice and messaging technologies for smartphones, tablets, and web applications. Voxofon is used to make free app-to-app domestic and international calls and texts as well as make cheap international calls and texts to friends and family that use feature phones or landlines.  The Voxofon app is a cross-platform application that is supported on iPhone, iPod Touch, iPad, Android, Blackberry, Windows Phone, and through any web browser.

The Voxofon app can connect calls and send texts through the voice network, 3G/4G, or WiFi depending on the user settings and preferences.

History
In February 2008, Voxofon began as a privately owned corporation headquartered in Houston, TX, and was one of the pioneers to enter the VoIP app market for smartphones when it launched a web-based app for iPhone in summer 2008. In October of that same year, Voxofon was the first to provide a VoIP app for the Android platform – offering cost-optimized international calls and texts. They followed suit with an identical app for BlackBerry smartphones in January 2009, and later that year for HP’s Palm WebOS platform. In October 2010, the Voxofon app was further expanded to support the launch of Windows Phone 7.

Since then, Voxofon has consistently released new features and versions on each of these platforms – making its products simpler and easier to use. In 2012 Voxofon developed Bridge Messaging technology, providing extensive chat features for smartphone to non-smartphone messaging. It also improved its app-to-app messaging, which allows Voxofon users to call and chat for free. In 2013, Voxofon introduced the option for users to earn free call credits by doing everyday actions like taking short surveys, viewing an advertisement, or watching a short video.  This capability, which is supported on iOS and Android devices, allows users to make even paid calls to international destinations for free. At the start of 2014, Voxofon updated their iOS app to include the ability to share photos, videos, voice memos, and location through SMS.

Customer satisfaction is very important to Voxofon. In February 2011, they expanded their support capabilities with a new call center and supports agents fluent in English, Spanish, Norwegian and Russian.

Products

App for Smartphones 
Voxofon has free apps for most smartphones. The applications are available for Android, iPhone, BlackBerry, and Windows Phone phones. These apps provide free or cheap international calling and texting services and are available through each platform’s respective app stores.

App for Tablets 
Having the same functionality as the smartphone apps, Voxofon has versions of their app which are optimized for tablets.  Supported devices include iPad, iPad Mini, and Windows Tablets.

Web-based Calling and Texting 
Using a headset, cheap international calls can be made directly from the Voxofon.com webpage.

Services

Free Calling and Texting 
Voxofon lets users make calls and send texts to any phone number around the world using call credits. Users can buy call credits or choose to earn free credits by doing everyday tasks like taking a survey, viewing an ad, or watching a video.  The capability is currently supported only on Android and iOS devices.

Voxofon users can also make free calls and send texts with other Voxofon user without using any credits as long as both users are registered with Voxofon and have the app installed on their smartphone.  User can also make free calls and texts through voxofon.com.

Cheap Calling and Texting 
Voxofon offers their users the ability to call any phone number, including landlines and feature phones at extremely low rates. Voxofon users enjoy call rates that are on average 98% less than major carriers and 50% less than Skype's Pay Per Minute rates.

Features

Global Support 
Using Voxofon through the Voxofon website, smartphone, or tablet, voice calls and SMS text messages can be sent to 700 networks in 200+ countries to both smartphones and non-smartphones.

Cross Platform Support 
Voxofon apps are supported on any web browser and across iOS, Android, BlackBerry, and Windows devices.

Call Landlines and Feature Phones 
Unlike other app-to-app VoIP providers, Voxofon also offers the ability to make calls and send texts to feature phones and landline for rates up to 98% less than traditional carriers.

Earn Free Call Credits 
Have the option to earn call credits rather than paying for them by doing every day activities like taking a short survey, viewing an ad, or watching a video.  This feature is currently supported on iOS and Android devices.

Share Rich Multimedia 
Send photos, video clips, voice memos, and location to any phone that can receive SMS.  This feature currently supported on the iOS platform.

See also
Voice over IP
Mobile VoIP
Comparison of VoIP software

References

Azevedo, Mary Ann. Houston firm rings up option for international wireless calls, Houston Business Journal, December 26, 2009
Poe, Robert. "15 Ways to Use VoIP to Save Money During the Downturn" VOIP-News. October 22, 2008
Kostek, Jessica. "As Economy Tanks, Consumers Turn to Web-Based Calling" TMCnet. October 29, 2008
Shanbhag, Jyothi. "VOXOFON Intros New BlackBerry(TM) Application for International Calls" TMCnet. January 15, 2009

External links
 Voxofon Main Website
 Voxofon Products
 Pricing
 Apple App Store
 Google Play
 Windows Phone Store
 BlackBerry AppWorld

VoIP services
VoIP companies of the United States
Android (operating system) software
IOS software
BlackBerry software